Bounce TV  is an American digital multicast television network owned by Katz Broadcasting, a subsidiary of E. W. Scripps Company. Promoted as "the first 24/7 digital multicast broadcast network created to target African Americans", the channel features a mix of original and acquired programming geared toward African-Americans between 25 and 54 years of age. The network is network affiliate with terrestrial television and television station in many media markets through digital subchannel; it is also available on the digital cable tiers of select cable providers at the discretion of local affiliates, The network is also available on Dish Network and DirecTV.

History
The network was founded on April 5, 2011. The founding group and initial ownership team included Martin Luther King III; former mayor of Atlanta, Georgia and ambassador of the United States to the United Nations Andrew Young and his son Andrew "Bo" Young III; and Rob Hardy and Will Packer, co-founders of Rainforest Films, a top African-American production company. Spearheading the network's creation were former Turner Broadcasting System executives Jonathan Katz and Ryan Glover with the pair having previously worked together with Tyler Perry to produce a number of high-order African-American sitcoms for TBS. Currently, Glover is president of Bounce TV and Katz is Chief Operating Officer. The "Bounce TV" name was chosen as a branding avenue to signify that the network is "going somewhere with energy".

The network formally launched on September 26, 2011 at 12:00 p.m. Eastern Time Zone, with the 1978 musical film The Wiz as its inaugural broadcast followed by A Raisin in the Sun with Do the Right Thing in primetime. The movie in primetime on the second day was Spike Lee's School Daze. This would be followed two days later with its first sports telecast, Central Intercollegiate Athletic Association football.

The network added its first acquired sitcoms in January 2015, when it acquired the rights to four series. On Friday, January 29, 2016, Bounce broadcast the 24th Annual Trumpet Awards, which honored history-making individuals. The network started producing its first primetime news magazine, Ed Gordon, in late June 2016 for a Tuesday, September 13, 2016 premiere.

On October 2, 2017, E. W. Scripps Company purchased Bounce TV along with Katz Broadcasting's three other networks. A list of 2019 Nielsen Media Research ratings published by Variety indicated that Bounce averaged 275,000 viewers in prime time, down 1% from the 2018 average.

Bounce and sister channel Grit TV were added to DirecTV on Sept 1st, 2022 (https://www.directv.com/binge/directv-adds-bounce-and-grit-to-channel-lineup/ )

Programming

Bounce TV features programming geared toward an African-American audience that skews older than the demographic that its cable competitor BET primarily targets (adults between the ages of 25 and 54, compared to BET's target demographic of youths and adults ages 12 to 34). Bounce TV's programming primarily features a mix of acquired series and feature films. The network added its first acquired sitcoms in January 2015, when it acquired the rights to four series through deals with Warner Bros. Television Studios (The Parent 'Hood and Roc), The Carsey–Warner Company (A Different World), CBS Television Distribution/Big Ticket Entertainment (Judge Joe Brown), 20th Television (The Hughleys) and Trifecta Entertainment & Media (Judge Faith). The 1990s CBS series Cosby was immediately removed from Bounce's schedule on July 7, 2015 after Bill Cosby's past admissions about his sexual assault allegations were publicized.

Unlike most digital multicast services (particularly with the January 2015 shutdown of Localish, which mainly carried first-run content), Bounce TV also carries original programming. The network added originally-produced inspirational and music programming, documentaries, and specials to its lineup in 2012, beginning with the broadcast television premiere of the documentary Dr. Martin Luther King, Jr.: A Historical Perspective on January 16, 2012, in observance of Martin Luther King Jr. Day. Bounce TV's first original weekly series debuted on June 18, 2012, with the series premieres of the sitcom Family Time and the stand-up comedy series Uptown Comic.

In addition, shortly before its launch, Bounce TV reached an agreement with the Central Intercollegiate Athletic Association (a league that includes several historically black colleges and universities) to acquire the television rights to broadcast its American football and basketball games; the telecasts were produced by Urban Sports Entertainment Group. The first sports broadcast on Bounce TV aired on September 28, 2011, a college football game between Bowie State University and Virginia Union University. Bounce's HBCU-centered sports programming expanded in 2013. Sports programming on the network ceased prior to the 2014 season (with Aspire acquiring the rights to some of the HBCU football telecasts).

On May 7, 2015, Bounce TV announced that they would be airing live boxing events from Premier Boxing Champions under the title: PBC: The Next Round.

On March 6, 2016, the debut of the primetime soap Saints & Sinners took in 1.3 million viewers, making it Bounce TV's most-watched program to date.

Current programming

Original
Bounce Celebrates Black History
Dying to Be Famous
Mann & Wife
Off the Chain2
Saints & Sinners (Drama)2
Trumpet Awards
Sitcoms
Act Your Age
Family Time2
In the Cut2 
Johnson
Finding Happy

Syndicated
America's Black Forum
A Different World
The Bernie Mac Show
Black and Blue
Black College Quiz
Couples Court with the Cutlers
Everybody Hates Chris
In the Heat of the Night
The Game
Hot Bench
Karamo
Lauren Lake's Paternity Court
Law & Order
OJ25
NCIS: New Orleans
Personal Injury Court
Scandal
Sherri
Tamron Hall
With Drawn Arms

Upcoming programming

Original
Secrets of the Salon (Third Quarter 2021)

Syndicated

Former programming

Original 
Ed Gordon
My Crazy Roommate
Grown Folks
One Love
Last Call

Syndicated
B. Smith with Style 
Catch 21 
The Cosby Show
Cosby
Forgive or Forget 
Greenleaf
Half & Half
The Hughleys
Judge Faith
Judge Hatchett
Judge Joe Brown 
Living Single 
Moesha 
One on One 
The Newlywed Game
Nick Cannon
The Parent 'Hood
The Real (day-after repeats)
Roc
Soul Train 
The Wendy Williams Show (day-after repeats)
Without a Trace

Affiliates

As of December 2014, Bounce TV has current or pending affiliation agreements with television stations in 43 media markets encompassing 22 states and the Washington, D.C., covering 73% of all households of at least one television set in the United States and 90% of African-American households. The network encourages its affiliates to carry local news programming in place of regular programming on the Bounce-affiliated subchannel, as a way to attract additional viewers to that subchannel and serve the local market. Affiliates also broadcast local public affairs programs, political specials, and college football and basketball games played by predominantly black schools. In Bounce TV's Home city Atlanta, ABC affiliate WSB-TV (channel 2), owned by Cox Media Group, is the Atlanta affiliate for Bounce TV.

Before its launch, Bounce TV actively sought affiliation agreements with various television station owners to make the network widely available throughout the United States. The network launched with clearance rate of, at minimum, 32% of overall American television households, in part due to affiliation agreements with stations owned by Raycom Media, LIN Media, and Media General.

In November 2011, Bounce TV reached a groupwide affiliation deal with Fox Television Stations to carry the network on the subchannels of its MyNetworkTV owned-and-operated station in markets such as New York City (WWOR-TV) and Los Angeles (KCOP-TV). The deal, which marked Fox Television Station's first multicasting arrangement, put Bounce TV over its earlier stated goal of reaching at least 50% of overall U.S. television households.

In December 2012, the network signed a multi-station agreement with Spanish language broadcaster Univision Communications to carry its programming on seven of its Univision and UniMás owned-and-operated television stations (besides being the company's first multicasting agreement, it was also Univision Television Group's first affiliation deal involving an English language network). As part of an extension of this agreement in March 2014, Bounce TV will move its affiliation in five markets where it had existing affiliation deals with Fox at the time of the deal (New York City, Los Angeles, Dallas–Fort Worth, Texas, Orlando, Florida, and Phoenix, Arizona) to stations owned by Univision in 2015. The Fox deal ended after the 2015 launch of game show channel Buzzr, with Bounce then moving in full to Univision stations after that point.

On June 15, 2016, Katz Broadcasting (whose president and CEO Jonathan Katz is COO of Bounce TV) signed an agreement with Nexstar Broadcasting Group that would bring Bounce TV to 15 new markets, as part of a massive rollout also involving Katz's three networks Escape, Laff, and Grit. In 2019, Raycom merged with Gray Television, which will maintain their Bounce affiliations as-is.

Following Scripps' acquisition of Ion Media on January 7, 2021, Scripps began to wind down the Univision deal, and Bounce TV was moved off those stations to Ion Media stations at the start of March, though it remains on a Univision station in markets were Scripps or Ion do not operate stations.

Bounce Media

Bounce Media operates Bounce TV and is owned by its founding group plus Raycom Media and Al Haymon. With share staff and some owners, Katz Broadcasting is an affiliate company.1

Originally, Bounce Media sold the network to affiliated TV stations via ad split but by October 2015 had moved to a carriage fee in exchange for the network get the ad inventory due to greater inventory with stations adding a third or fourth subchannel.1 Bounce used direct response advertising as a meter of viewers before switching to Nielsen rating C-3 a few years before 2015.3

Bounce launched a companion SVOD service, Brown Sugar by November 17, 2016. Brown Sugar features '70s-era blaxploitation films. The service has access to start to a total of 111 films including Blacula,  Cleopatra Jones, Foxy Brown, The Mack,  Super Fly, and Shaft.

On August 1, 2017, E. W. Scripps announced the purchase of Bounce and Katz Broadcasting, which operates Bounce and owns three networks, for $292 million, acquiring the other 95% of the company. Bounce will remain based out of Marietta, Georgia and retain Jonathan Katz as head. The purchase was completed on October 2, 2017.

Brown Sugar

Brown Sugar is a video on demand service owned by Bounce Media, LLC. A companion to the main Bounce network, Brown Sugar was launched on November 17, 2016.

The service features '70s-era blaxploitation films via app, the web and Chromecast. The service has access to over 111 films including Blacula,  Cleopatra Jones, Foxy Brown, The Mack,  Super Fly, and Shaft. On Friday, August 4, 2017, Brown Sugar launched on Roku; boxing matches and in-season original Bounce series have since been added.

See also

 BET – an American basic cable and satellite channel a part of the Paramount Media Networks, currently owned by Paramount Global, which launched in 1980 as the first television network devoted to programming targeting African-Americans 
 BET Her – spinoff network specifically targeting African-American women
 TV One – an American digital cable and satellite channel owned by Urban One
 Cleo TV – spinoff network specifically targeting African-American women
 Aspire – an American digital cable and satellite channel owned by Magic Johnson

References

External links

E. W. Scripps Company
Television networks in the United States
Television channels and stations established in 2011
English-language television stations in the United States
African-American television
African-American television networks
2011 establishments in the United States